Ubisoft Blue Byte GmbH (Blue Byte until 2017) is a German video game holding company owned by Ubisoft. It was founded in October 1988 by Thomas Hertzler and Lothar Schmitt as a developer and was best known for developing the Anno and The Settlers series. The studio was acquired by Ubisoft in 2001. Related Designs was merged into Blue Byte in 2013, and a third studio in Berlin was established in 2018. Since 2019, Ubisoft Blue Byte acts as the parent company of Ubisoft's three German studios, which became branded as Ubisoft Düsseldorf, Ubisoft Mainz and Ubisoft Berlin. By 2020, the "Blue Byte" name was phased out.

History

Foundation and first games (1988–1993) 
In 1988, Thomas Hertzler and Lothar Schmitt left Rainbow Arts, a German video game developer, and founded their own, Blue Byte, in October that year. To do so, Hertzler and Schmitt used a starting capital of 10,000 Deutsche Mark borrowed from Hertzler's parents and established an office in the attic of Hertzler's home in Mülheim.

Blue Byte's first published game was the tennis simulation Great Courts, released in 1989 by Ubi Soft (later renamed Ubisoft). Blue Byte's first big success in Germany and Europe was the turn-based strategy game Battle Isle, completed in 1991. Inspired by the Japanese game Nectaris for the PC Engine, Battle Isle spawned numerous add-ons and sequels. The company's next big success followed in 1993 with the release of the managerial game Die Siedler, marketed internationally as The Settlers. The Settlers also had numerous sequels and became the most well-known of Blue Byte's products.

Major projects (1994–2000) 
Over the years, Blue Byte developed and/or published numerous innovative titles including Chewy: Escape from F5 and Albion, but most of them were not successful internationally. Efforts to break into the American market, usually aided with publishing by Accolade, failed and success was limited to Germany and parts of Europe. In 1995 a Chicago-based entrepreneur named Julian Pretto travelled to Germany and convinced the founders to open a North American office. Following the successful release of Battle Isle 2020 in the United States, Pretto left the firm to pursue other interests. Three years later, Blue Byte moved from Chicago, Illinois, to its new facilities in Austin, Texas.

The popular turn-based strategy Battle Isle series from the early 1990s achieved cult status similar to Settlers. However, when it was revised in 1997 as a 3-D tactical game Incubation similar to X-COM: UFO Defense and later in 2001 Battle Isle: The Andosia War, which tried to bridge the gap between turn-based strategies and real-time strategies, it alienated many players who came to expect that the Battle Isle brand would represent traditional turn-based strategies.

As a subsidiary of Ubisoft (2001–present) 
In February 2001, Blue Byte was acquired by Ubi Soft and tasked to focus on Blue Byte's two most popular series. At the time of the acquisition, Blue Byte had a staff of 64 people and was active in the United Kingdom, Germany, and the United States.

Around 2013, Blue Byte worked with Related Designs on two of its titles including Might and Magic Heroes Online. Related Designs was acquired by Ubisoft in April 2013, from which point on the company would develop projects in tandem with Blue Byte. Related Designs was merged into Blue Byte in June 2014, becoming Blue Byte's second internal studio. In 2014, Blue Byte developed The Settlers: Kingdoms of Anteria. In 2015, the studio worked on Anno 2205. In 2016, the studio worked on Champions of Anteria, replacing The Settlers: Kingdoms of Anteria. The new game was a change from the original The Settlers series, with new gameplay. In 2017, the studio helped on the development for the game Skull & Bones. By late 2017, it had also worked on For Honor and Rainbow Six: Siege. In 2018, the studio announced The Settlers, the eighth game in the series. Blue Byte is also developing Anno 1800. The studio is also working on Beyond Good and Evil 2 together with Ubisoft Montpellier.

In 2017, Blue Byte was rebranded Ubisoft Blue Byte, with a new logo introduced just prior to the Gamescom event in August. A third Blue Byte studio in Berlin was announced in April 2017. The studio was formed out of a building formerly occupied by the Berliner Bank. Ubisoft Blue Byte's studio operations manager, Istvan Tajnay, became the new studio's studio manager. Although part of Ubisoft Blue Byte, the Berlin-based studio was intentionally named "Ubisoft Berlin". Ubisoft Berlin began operating in early 2018 and held its official opening on 25 September 2018, then employing 60 people. At the same time, Blue Byte's Düsseldorf and Mainz studios had 230 and 100 employees, respectively. At Gamescom in August 2019, Ubisoft Blue Byte revealed a new corporate identity in which its self-branded studios were renamed Ubisoft Düsseldorf and Ubisoft Mainz. The move primarily aimed at attracting further employees as Ubisoft Blue Byte expected to expand from 520 staff members at the time to 1,000 by 2023. All three studios remain under the Ubisoft Blue Byte legal umbrella. By December 2020, the "Ubisoft Blue Byte" branding was mostly phased out, with the previously stale social media channels deactivated. However, Ubisoft Blue Byte remained the legal parent to its three studios.

Games developed or published

Battle Isle series

Settlers series

Anno series

Other

See also 

 List of companies in Germany
 List of video game developers

References

External links 
 

Companies based in Düsseldorf
Ubisoft divisions and subsidiaries
Video game companies established in 1988
Video game companies of Germany
Video game development companies
Video game publishers
German companies established in 1988
2001 mergers and acquisitions